The molecules that an organism uses as its carbon source for generating biomass are referred to as "carbon sources" in biology. It is possible for organic or inorganic sources of carbon. Heterotrophs must use organic molecules as both are a source of carbon and energy, in contrast to autotrophs, which can use inorganic materials as both a source of carbon and an abiotic source of energy, such as, for instance, inorganic chemical energy or light (photoautotrophs) (chemolithotrophs). The carbon cycle, which begins with a carbon source that is inorganic, such as carbon dioxide and progresses through the carbon fixation process, includes the biological use of carbon as one of its components.[1]

Sources of carbon

Any place where carbon is produced, whether naturally or artificially, as well as any chemical molecules made of carbon, such carbon dioxide and methane, are considered carbon sources. Carbon comes from a variety of sources, such as fossil fuel combustion, wildfires, animal respiration, and plant deterioration. such resources come from across the world, albeit some might produce more than others.

Plastics are an additional, more and more common source of carbon. Plastics, and Microplastics are not exclusively produced using fossil fuels. (And hence from carbon itself), but they're also When measuring environmental carbon pollution, substantial manmade carbon producers are typically ignored. However, as plastic breaks down, carbon is released into the air, water, and soil.

Types of carbon source

Autotrophs

An organism is said to be an autotroph or primary producer if it uses carbon from uncomplicated components like making complicated organic molecules using carbon dioxide (like carbohydrates, lipids, and proteins). Inorganic chemical processes or photosynthesis are often needed to power this activity (chemosynthesis). They convert energy from an abiotic source, such light, into energy that may be used by other species by storing it in organic compounds (e.g., heterotrophs). The producers in a food chain are referred to as autotrophs because they don't need a live source of carbon or energy, like land plants or aquatic algae (As opposed to heterotrophs, which are consumers of other heterotrophs or autotrophs.) (2)

Heterotrophs

An organism is referred to as a heterotroph if it consumes other plants or animals for food and energy. Its origins are in the Greek words hetero, which means "other," and trope, which means "nutrition."

Types

Organotrophs and lithotrophs are two types of heterotrophs. Reduced carbon molecules, including as proteins, lipids, and carbohydrates from plants and animals, are used as electron sources by organotrophs. Lith heterotrophs, in contrast, rely on inorganic materials like sulfur, nitrite, or ammonium to provide them with electrons. Another method to classify various heterotrophs is to label as chemotrophs or phototrophs, respectively. Chemotrophs utilise the energy produced by the oxidation of substances in their surroundings, whereas phototrophs use light to obtain energy and carry out metabolic activities.

Most often, carbon sources are the crucial components for the growth of microalgae. In general, photoautotrophic, heterotrophic, and mixotrophic conditions can all be used to develop microalgae using several sources of carbon such carbon dioxide, methanol, acetate, glucose, or other organic substances Microalgae employ inorganic carbon sources like as a source of carbon, choose carbon dioxide or bicarbonates. for photosynthesis to make chemical energy when grown in photoautotrophic conditions. Some species of microalgae can use Using organic carbon as a carbon source whether there is light or not. We refer to this as heterotrophic culture. Despite the widespread use of organic carbon sources, the most often employed carbon sources for microalgae development are still carbon dioxide or bicarbonates. and the production of biofuels. (2006) (Xu et al.) (2010) Ren et al. (2004) Chojnacka and Noworyta

Carbon cycle

All five of the Earth's environmental spheres are impacted by the carbon cycle, one of the most significant biogeochemical cycles on the planet. The biological carbon cycle takes place across timescales ranging from days to thousands of years, but the geological components of the carbon cycle function over millions of years. Photosynthesis and respiration are the two main biological processes involved in the carbon cycle. Every living thing on Earth needs carbon for both its structure and for energy. The biological carbon cycle currently includes the incorporation of biological carbon into sedimentary deposits that are subsequently exploited as fossil fuels. This is significant because it affects both the Earth's temperature and the global carbon budget.

Current developments

As the nitrate water quality requirement tightens, bioreactors and built wetlands (CW) commonly utilize plant carbon sources for denitrification, However, a thorough examination of the effectiveness of nitrate removal from different plant carbon sources is lacking. This research examines the denitrification performance of various plant carbon sources as well as the impact of dosing method and pretreatment to examine the precise methods for using plant carbon sources to remove nitrogen (as nitrate) It is determined that denitrification should be researched and improved upon in the future. In all types of CWs and bioreactors, the addition of plant carbon sources can marginally improve the efficiency of nitrate removal.

References 

 
 
 

Carbon cycle
Biochemistry